Gabriel Yared  (Arabic: غبريال يارد; born 7 October 1949) is a Lebanese-French composer, best known for his work in French and American cinema.

Born in Beirut, Lebanon, Yared scored the French films Betty Blue and Camille Claudel. He later worked on English-language films, particularly those directed by Anthony Minghella.  He won an Academy Award for Best Original Score and a Grammy Award for his work on The English Patient (1996) and was nominated for both The Talented Mr. Ripley (1999) and Cold Mountain (2003).

Life and career
When Yared was 7, his father sent him to an accordion teacher. Two years later Yared stopped his accordion lessons and started music theory and piano lessons. Although he was not necessarily a gifted pianist, Yared was interested in reading music. When Yared was 14, his piano teacher died and Yared replaced him as the organist of Université Saint-Joseph. Yared used the university's library to read the works of Johann Sebastian Bach, Robert Schumann, and many other composers. This extensive reading inspired his first original composition, a piano waltz.

Yared gained a degree in law and did not formally study music at the university level until he traveled to France in 1969 to attend the École Normale de Musique de Paris as a non-registered student. There he learned the rules of music composition from Henri Dutilleux.

At the end of 1971, Yared went to Brazil to visit his uncle and was asked by the president of the World Federation of Light Music Festivals to write a song to represent the Lebanese in the Rio de Janeiro Song Festival. The song he composed went on to win first prize.  While in Brazil, he also performed with a small orchestra. Yared subsequently said that his time in Brazil greatly influenced his work.

In 1975, he arranged the album Minacantalucio for the popular Italian singer Mina.

He then went back to France, where he met and collaborated with the Costa Brothers, Jacques Dutronc, Françoise Hardy, Charles Aznavour, Mireille Mathieu, and numerous other musicians. This was a prolific period for the composer and he wrote nearly 3,000 pieces over a span of about six years. His contributions included a number of radio and TV jingles, such as TF1 news jingles and an episode on the series In the Tracks of.

Film scores
Yared is best known for his collaborations with the late Anthony Minghella.  His first collaboration with Minghella was the 1996 film The English Patient, which was highly acclaimed and won him an Oscar for Best Original Score.  He composed the scores for all of Minghella's subsequent films and the music for the television series The No. 1 Ladies' Detective Agency, co-created by Minghella and Richard Curtis.

Aside from his work with Minghella, Yared scored a number of other films, including Betty Blue (1986), Map of the Human Heart (1992), City of Angels (1998), Message in a Bottle (1999), Autumn in New York (2000), The Next Best Thing (2000), Possession (2002), and Bon Voyage (2003). He had a notable collaboration with René Laloux in the late 1980es on Gandahar and How Wang-fo was saved produced at the SEK Studio in North Korea.

Cassandra Clare reported in August 2012 that Yared was tapped to compose the score for The Mortal Instruments: City of Bones. However, he was eventually replaced on the project by Atli Örvarsson.

Troy soundtrack
In 2004, Yared's score for the film Troy was rejected less than a month before the film's opening as a result of the poor reception by a test screening audience. The test audience were said to have found Yared's music too "brassy and bold". James Horner, the composer of the scores for such films as Braveheart and Titanic was then hired to create a replacement score in less than four weeks.

Yared expressed his dismay at the score's rejection in an open letter which was posted on his website. He said that the score which the test audience had heard was not yet finished and mixed properly, and that the studio had given him no opportunity to alter his score in light of the audience's reaction.

Warner Bros. still owns the rights to Yared's Troy score and an official recording is not currently available and may never be (although selections from the score were briefly posted on Yared's website and private promotional CD).

Film score critic Christian Clemmensen of Filmtracks.com felt that Yared's work for Troy was far superior to what Horner had written, giving Horner's score a 3-star rating and Yared's a 5-star rating, saying that it was "outstanding," and called it the "pinnacle of Yared's career."

Ballet scores
Yared created the score to the narrative ballet Raven Girl choreographed to the Royal Ballet by Wayne McGregor after the story by Audrey Niffenegger.

Selected filmography

Sauve qui peut (la vie) (1980) Music
La Lune dans le caniveau (1983) Music
Dangerous Moves (1984) Music
Le téléphone sonne toujours deux fois!! (1985) Music
37°2 le matin [Betty Blue] (1986) Music
Beyond Therapy (1987) Music
Agent trouble (1987) Music
L'homme voilé (1987) Music
Gandahar (1987) Music (not in US dubbed version Light Years)
Camille Claudel (1989) Music
Clean and Sober (1988) Music
Une nuit à l'Assemblée Nationale (1988)
Romero (1989) Music
Les 1001 Nuits (1990) Music
Vincent & Theo (1990) Music
The King's Whore (1990) Music
Tatie Danielle (1991) Music and theme song "The Complaint of the Old Bitch" (sung by Catherine Ringer)
L'Amant [The Lover] (1992) Music
La Fille de l'air (1992) Music
Map of the Human Heart (1993) Music
The English Patient (1996) Original Music
City of Angels (1998) Music and Orchestrations
Message in a Bottle (1999) Music and Orchestrations
The Talented Mr. Ripley (1999) Music, Orchestrations and songs
Autumn in New York (2000) Composed and Conductor
The Next Best Thing (2000) Music, Conductor and Orchestrations
Possession (2002) Composer, Conductor and Orchestrations
Bon voyage (2003) Music
Cold Mountain (2003) Composed and Orchestrations
Sylvia (2003) Composer
Shall We Dance? (2004) Music
Troy (2004) Composed and Orchestrated (Music Rejected from Final Film)
Das Leben der Anderen (2006) Music
Azur and Asmar (2006) Music
Breaking and Entering (2006) Music (with Underworld)
1408 (2007) Music
Coco Chanel & Igor Stravinsky (2009) Original music
Amelia (2009) Original music
The Hedgehog (2009) Original music
The Tourist (2010) Original music - Score rejected; replaced by James Newton Howard. The movie does carry his track "Dance in F"
In the Land of Blood and Honey (2011) Original music
A Royal Affair (2012) Co-composed with Cyrille Aufort
Haute Cuisine (French original title: Les Saveurs du Palais)(2012) Original music 
Belle du Seigneur (2012) Original Music
A Promise (2013)
The Prophet (2014) Original music
By the Sea (2015) Original music
Chocolat (2016)
It's Only the End of the World (2016)
The Promise (2016)
The Death and Life of John F. Donovan (2018)
Judy (2019)

Awards and nominations
Yared has been nominated for the Academy Award for Best Original Score on three occasions.  He won for The English Patient in 1996.  He was also nominated for The Talented Mr. Ripley (1999) and Cold Mountain (2003), but lost to John Corigliano and Howard Shore, respectively.  He has also received three Golden Globe and three BAFTA nominations for the same films, and won both awards for The English Patient.

He has been nominated for two Grammy Awards, again winning for The English Patient.

References

External links
Official website
Interview with Gabriel Yared, on "1408"
 

1949 births
Living people
Musicians from Beirut
French film score composers
French male film score composers
Lebanese film score composers
Saint Joseph University alumni
French music arrangers
French people of Lebanese descent
École Normale de Musique de Paris alumni
Golden Globe Award-winning musicians
Grammy Award winners
European Film Awards winners (people)
Best Original Music Score Academy Award winners
Best Original Music BAFTA Award winners
Commandeurs of the Ordre des Arts et des Lettres
Varèse Sarabande Records artists